Jan Endeman (born 22 May 1957 in Eibergen, the Netherlands) is a Dutch retired footballer.

References

Association football goalkeepers
Dutch footballers
Living people
1957 births
Go Ahead Eagles players
Edmonton Drillers (1979–1982) players